Przyszowa  is a village in southern Poland, in the Limanowa County, within the province of Lesser Poland. The village has 2,470 inhabitants.

Etymology
The village name Przyszowa is traditionally derived from the word "przychodzić" (come).

History
Przyszowa is one of the oldest villages in the Limanowa County. The earliest surviving documentary reference to the village dates from 1326. However, the ruins of the medieval Przyszowa Castle, atop the Łyżka (Wyżka) hill overlooking the village, are from a much earlier date, possibly 11th century. It is believed that the castle originally belonged to the castellans of Nowy Sącz, and then to the Wierzbięta family of the noble Janina clan.

At the end of the 13th century, for unknown reason, the Wierzbięta family abandoned the castle and relocated into a new manor house in the centre of the village, where they ruled until the middle of the 17th century. In the second half of the 17th century part of the village belonged to the Dunin-Wąsowicz family of the Łabędź clan. In 1655 Krzysztof Dunin-Wąsowicz famously lead an army of local landlords and peasants to victory against a much larger Swedish garrison near Limanowa, during the Second Northern War between Sweden and the Polish–Lithuanian Commonwealth. In 1683 the village was purchased by the Żuk-Skarszewski family of the Nałęcz clan after their family manor in Skarszowice in Podolia was destroyed by the Cossacks during the Polish–Cossack–Tatar War. The descendants of the Żuk-Skarszewski family continue to live in the village.

In 1880 Tytus Czyżewski was born here, one of the pioneers of modern Polish painting. In 1969 Jerzy Harasymowicz, a Polish poet, in his poetry collection  "Madonny polskie" (Polish  Madonnas), made famous the 14th-century Gothic statue of the Madonna of Przyszowa, as one of the finest examples of the so-called "spisko-sądecki" style.

Religion

Jan Długosz, a Polish chronicler, confirms that a Roman Catholic parish existed in the village as early as 1326. Since then, the village was predominantly Catholic with a small Jewish minority, except for a brief period around the turn of the 16th century, when the local nobility, including the owners of the village, the Wierzbieta family, converted to Arianism. In 1580 the parish priest was expelled from the village and the church gradually fell into disrepair and was eventually demolished. In 1612 the Wierzbieta family converted back to Catholicism and provided funds for the construction of a new wooden Church of St. Nicholas, which stood until the end of the 19th century. In 1901–1906 a new Church of St. Nicholas was built in brick with stone dressings, to a design by the architect Teodor Talowski, which is a spectacular example of neo-Gothic architecture.

Culture
Przyszowa is one of the largest centres of the culture of Lachy Sądeckie, an ethnographic group of Polish people characterised by a specific dialect and culture, living in the southern Lesser Poland.Their rich folk culture contains a variety of cultural elements from the highlands and the lowlands of Lesser Poland. The village is home to the regional ensemble "Przyszowianie", which focuses on the unique folk traditions of Lachy Sądeckie and performs live music and dance at folk festivals across the country.

Geography

Przyszowa is located in the east part of Island Beskids mountain range in the Carpathian Mountains. It lies in the valley between the three hills of Łyżka, Pępówka and Piekło. The centre of the village is located on both sides of the river Słomka, 420 – 500 meters above sea level, while the Łyżka hill lies 807 meters above sea level.

Climate
Przyszowa has a typical mountain climate with variable weather conditions. Dry air masses from mainland Europe clash here with moist air from the Atlantic. A characteristic feature of the area is a frequent occurrence of sea fog over the valleys caused by temperature inversion. This makes only individual peaks visible, like islands in the sea, hence the name of the area Island Beskids. July is the hottest month of the year when average temperature reaches 27 °C (81 °F), while February, the coldest month of the year sees -12 °C (10 °F) of average low.

People
 Krzysztof Dunin-Wąsowicz, Polish military commander, colonel, participated in the Second Northern War against Sweden.
 Tytus Czyżewski (1880–1945), Polish painter, art theoretician, Futurist poet, playwright, member of the Polish Formists, and Colorist.
 dyrcio

References

Villages in Limanowa County